John Baxter (15 October 1936 – 12 December 2014) was a Scottish footballer, who played as a wing half for Hibernian, Falkirk and Clydebank during the 1950s and 1960s. He was capped once by Scotland at under-23 level, and played for Hibs in the 1958 Scottish Cup Final, which Hibs lost 1–0 to Clyde. Clyde's winning goal was scored with a shot that deflected off Baxter.

John Baxter died on 12 December 2014, aged 78.

References

Sources

External links
John Baxter profile, www.ihibs.co.uk; accessed 13 December 2014.

1936 births
2014 deaths
Footballers from Glasgow
Scottish footballers
Scottish Football League players
Hibernian F.C. players
Falkirk F.C. players
Clydebank F.C. (1965) players
Scotland under-23 international footballers
Association football wing halves
Place of death missing
Benburb F.C. players